Phibbs Exchange is a major transit exchange in the District of North Vancouver, British Columbia. Part of the TransLink system, it is home to routes serving North Vancouver and some parts of the city of Vancouver. Opened on October 19, 1973, it is one of the four major transit exchanges on the North Shore (the others being Capilano University Exchange, Lonsdale Quay and Park Royal Exchange). The exchange is named after Charles J.P. Phibbs.

Structure and location
Phibbs Exchange is located directly next to the northern foot of the Ironworkers Memorial Bridge, which connects North Vancouver to East Vancouver and Burnaby. It can accommodate regular-length and articulated diesel buses and community shuttle buses only.

The exchange is also located a short distance from Capilano University and North Shore Studios. The Pacific National Exhibition grounds is also nearby, just across the bridge in Vancouver. The exchange is located next to a park and ride facility.

Security at Phibbs Exchange is the responsibility of the Transit Security Department. Transit security officers can be found making random patrols of the exchange and conducting fare inspections on board buses. North Vancouver RCMP also make random patrols of the exchange. Bus drivers also have the ability to call for Transit Security in the event of an incident.

Upgrades 
Major upgrades were planned for the exchange in 2022, with construction scheduled to finish in the first quarter of 2024. The first phase of construction began in November 2022.

Routes

See also
Kootenay Loop (the transit exchange just across the bridge)
List of bus routes in Metro Vancouver

References

External links
Map of Phibbs Exchange (PDF file)

TransLink (British Columbia) bus stations
Transport in North Vancouver (district municipality)